Three steamships of Bullard, King & Co Ltd. were named Umtali:

, in service until 1925
, in service until 1957
, in service 1951–52

Ship names